Marty Morton is a performer who has acted in many TV, theatre and commercials in Australia and in other countries including England.

Morton was born in the north of England and emigrated to Australia.

Television
In Britain, Morton has appeared on Crackerjack and Seaside Special.

In Australia he has acted in TV shows including Spyforce, Division 4, The Young Doctors, All Saints, and  The Restless Years.

When comedian Rod Hull and his Emu puppet character left the Super Flying Fun Show and Australia, a duplicate of Emu was made so the character could continue on the show as Marty and Emu, much to Hull's annoyance, Marty Morton took over Hull's co-hosting position with Marilyn Mayo in Australia.  Not long after, Marty became a regular on the Super Flying Fun Show.

In 2003 he was a guest on Channel 4 documentary on Rod Hull,  Rod Hull: A Bird in the Hand .

Stage
Morton's pantomime credits include Cinderella, Dick Whittington, Mother Goose and Our Own-Bush Homebush.

He has entertained with his 'sidekicks' Emu, Camel, Jake the Peg and Talkin' Horse.

Morton has appeared with Dorothy Lamour, Diana Trask, Florence Henderson, Al Martino and Human Nature.

Among his talents is the production of sets and props.

Awards

Mo Awards
The Australian Entertainment Mo Awards (commonly known informally as the Mo Awards), were annual Australian entertainment industry awards. They recognise achievements in live entertainment in Australia from 1975 to 2016. Marty Morton won three awards in that time.
 (wins only)
|-
| 1982
| Marty Morton
| Versatile Variety Act of the Year
| 
|-
| 1983
| Marty Morton
| Versatile Variety Act of the Year
| 
|-
| 1986
| Marty Morton
| Versatile Variety Act of the Year
| 
|-

References

External links
 
  Marty Morton's website

Living people
Australian television personalities
Year of birth missing (living people)